Inverell was an electoral district of the Legislative Assembly in the Australian state of New South Wales, created in 1880 and including Inverell. It was abolished in 1904, with the downsizing of the Legislative Assembly after Federation, and was largely replaced by Gwydir.

Members for Inverell

Election results

Notes

References

Former electoral districts of New South Wales
New England (New South Wales)
1880 establishments in Australia
Constituencies established in 1880
1904 disestablishments in Australia
Constituencies disestablished in 1904